Abbottsburg is a small unincorporated community in Bladen County, North Carolina, United States.  In 1950, it had a population of 157. Abbottsburg was named for Joseph Carter Abbott, president of the Cape Fear Building Company. The community incorporated in 1903, though it later disincorporated.

Sources

Encyclopædia Britannica Atlas. 1950 Edition, p. 298.

Unincorporated communities in Bladen County, North Carolina
Unincorporated communities in North Carolina